Welsford may refer to:

 Welsford is the name of a community in New Brunswick, Canada
 Welsford is the name of two communities in Nova Scotia, Canada
 Welsford is also a family name. e.g. Malcolm Welsford.